Tamara Shayne (25 November 1902 – 23 October 1983), also known as Tamara Nikoulina, was a Russian-born actress and long-time resident in the United States.

Early life
Tamara Shayne was born Tamara Veniaminovna Olkenitskaya on 25 November 1902 in Perm, Russia, to the family of a Jewish actor Veniamin Olkenitsky-Nikulin (aka Benjamin Nikulin). Her older brother Konstantin was also an actor.

Career
Shayne appeared in European films before migrating to the United States in 1927 with her future husband, the actor Akim Tamiroff; the couple married in February 1933.

Her first role (uncredited) in an American film was in The Captain Hates the Sea (1934). She also appeared uncredited in Ninotchka (1939) as Anna, the cellist roommate of the titular character portrayed by Greta Garbo. Shayne appeared in nearly two dozen films from 1934-61, and is possibly best remembered as Moma Yoelson in The Jolson Story (1946) and Jolson Sings Again (1949).

Personal life
Shayne remained married to Akim Tamiroff until his death in 1972, and she retired at that time. She died from complications following a heart attack on 23 October 1983.

Filmography

References

External links
 
 

1902 births
1983 deaths
Actors from Perm, Russia
20th-century American actresses
American people of Russian-Jewish descent
Soviet emigrants to the United States
Russian Jews